Planjane is a village near Rečane and Brezovica, Kosovo.

History
Planjane is located in the historical region of Sredačka župa, a medieval župa (small administrative division) within, now part of southeastern Kosovo. It encompassed seven hamlets and was centered in the town of Sredska.

Demographics 
The village is inhabited by Bosniaks.

Notable people 
 Alen Azari, politician from the Nova Demokratska Stranka party

Notes and references 

Notes:

References:

Villages in Prizren